Khao Pu–Khao Ya National Park (Thai:เขาปู่-เขาย่า) is the 42nd national park of Thailand. It spreads across three southern provinces: Nakhon Si Thammarat, Phatthalung, and Trang. It was established on May 27, 1982. It is known for its diverse ecosystem and wide range of wildlife; consisting of 162 animal species. It was named by local people "Bha Brommajan" which means "the forest of virginity".

History 
Khao Ya, and especially Khao Pu, are considered to be holy places in Phatthalung Province. People believe that Khao Pu is the place where Ta Pu spirit lives. Ta Pu is half-human, half-Gandharvas (god of music). People often visit to ask him for his blessing. Ta Pu symbolizes goodness and purity. Every year people gather to participate in a ceremony  worshipping Ta Pu and their ancestors.

Around April to May people annually participate in "wan wang" which means "free day". Usually held for three days, over this period people cease all kind of activities. This traditional ceremony is very similar to Songkran (Thai New Year). In this ceremony, however, not only laypersons can participate, but monks are also allowed to join. People will gently pour and sprinkle water on statues of Buddha first, then on monks and elders. Nobody is allowed to play before the ablution. Every evening of each day there is local folk storytelling, dancing, and games.

Around September to October annually people participate in "Ching Pretah Day" which is a giving day to ancestor spirits, ghosts, and demons. On this day people will bring desserts such as kanom la, kanom ba, kanom pong, kanom thian, and kanom  bae-som (also called joah hu) to the ceremony. They also bring rice, garlic, shrimp paste, chili, coconuts, sugar cane, salt, onions, bananas, candles, and joss-sticks. Then they will set up a table. After the prayer people gather around the table and snatch (it is a tradition, people do it just for fun) food for themselves, believing that it will bring them good luck. Every dessert offered to the spirits represents a particular object. Kanom la is a blanket, kanom ba is a coin, kanom pong is jewelry, kanom bae-som is money, and kanom thian is a pillow.

Geography 
The park, with an area of 433,750 rai ~  lies in the Nakhon Si Thammarat Range or Banthat mountain range. Hin Tan Hill is the highest peak of the park at 877 meters above sea level. Approximately 60 percent of the park is covered with tropical rain forest and some areas of the park are covered with evergreen forest. Khao Banthat Wildlife Sanctuary is beside Khao Pu Khao Ya National Park.
The center of the park is considered to be the demarcation line, separating Trang and Phatthalung Provinces. The dividing line is a brook, the water source for people who live in both provinces. Khao Pu Khao Ya in Phatthalung Province is the water source of the La Mai, Mai Siab, and Cha-Uat canals which unite with the Pak Panang River. On the other side, in Trang province, Khao Pu Khao Ya is the water source of Lamphu Ra and Lamor canals which join the Trang River.

Climate 

The average temperature of the park is around 20-35 degrees Celsius. The rainy season is around May and December and the precipitation is 1,600-2,500 mL per year.

Flora and fauna
Khao Pu Khao Ya National Park contains various animal species. About 60 species of mammals are found here. Some are endangered: palm civet, ground beetle, serow, and yellow-throated marten. Sixty-seven species of reptiles live in the park: blue-winged flying lizard, equatorial spitting cobra, southern curved-toed gecko, roughneck monitor lizard, and cave-dwelling snake. Seventy species of insects are found: Troides amphrysus (butterfly), giant red bug and the Malayan jungleglory (butterfly).

Various birds live in the park: blacked-headed Bulbul, oriental dwarf kingfisher, and puff backed Bulbul. In Khao Pu Khao Ya National Park, mammals are rarely seen. Some are found in particular areas. Most of the animals are endangered species and they are under the protection of the Wildlife Preservation and Protection Act. For example, the Malayan tapir (protected since 1992).

Most of the plants in the park are local plants which still exist in some southern rural areas and most of them were used for product and architectural design. Some hardwood plants such as Hopea odorata, Semecarpus curtisii King and Intsia palembanica Miq. are very popular for building construction.

Tourist attractions 
Matcha Cave is in Khao Pu Khao Ya National Park, Phatthalung Province. There are two routes that lead to the cave. One is the main route which is 2.5 kilometers. Another is a walking trail which is 1.8 kilometers from the visitor center. Inside the cave, there is a fish lake which is 100 meters wide and decorated with stalactites. At the cave's center there are approximately 10 statues of Buddha. Due to slippery pathways, nobody is allowed to enter the area after 16:00.
Pak Jam Waterfall is a seven-tiered waterfall in Khao Pu Khao Ya National Park, Trang Province.  Visitors can only travel by foot. It takes approximately an hour to walk to Pak Jam waterfall.
Nan-Prew Waterfall is a stepped waterfall in Nakhon Si Thammarat Province. The water originates from the Banthat Mountain Range and rejoins the Cha-uat canal below.
Bee-hive cliff viewpoint is in Khao Pu Khao Ya National Park, Phatthalung. The cliff is 250 meters from the visitor center. Visitors can travel either by foot or bicycle (available in the park). At the cliff, visitors can see clearly the entire area of the park and the Banthat mountain range. Along the cliff, there are thousands of bee hives built annually, in the summer season (February to April).

Park information 
There is an admission fee for entrance to the park.
Accommodations are available in the park.

See also
List of national parks of Thailand
List of Protected Areas Regional Offices of Thailand

References

External links
Khao-Pu Khao Ya
ธรรมชาติสงบร่มเย็นที่ “อุทยานแห่งชาติ เขาปู่ เขาย่า” มรดกล้ำค่าของเมืองลุง
  อุทยานแห่งชาติเขาปู่-เขาย่า

Further reading
 Graham, M. (1991). National Parks of Thailand. Bangkok: Thai Wattana Panich.
 National Park office. (2006). National Parks in Thailand. Bangkok: Nature Tree Co., Ltd
 National Park office. (2015). National Parks in Thailand. Bangkok: Amarin Printing and Publishing Public Co., Ltd
 National Park office. (2015). The Best of National Parks of Thailand. Bangkok: Eastern Printing Public Company Limited

National parks of Thailand
Protected areas established in 1982
1982 establishments in Thailand